Krzyżanki may refer to the following places:
Krzyżanki, Gostyń County in Greater Poland Voivodeship (west-central Poland)
Krzyżanki, Wągrowiec County in Greater Poland Voivodeship (west-central Poland)
Krzyżanki, Człuchów County in Pomeranian Voivodeship (north Poland)
Krzyżanki, Sztum County in Pomeranian Voivodeship (north Poland)